VAA may refer to:

 Vaagri Booli language, by ISO 639-3 code
 Vaasa Airport, Finland, by IATA code
 Van Andel Arena
 Virgin Atlantic Airways
 Voting advice application

See also
 Vaa (disambiguation)
 Va'a
 Vaas (disambiguation)